Strike! is a comic book that was written by Chuck Dixon, with art by Tom Lyle and Romeo Tanghal, and published by Eclipse Comics.

Plot
Strike! is about a teenage boy who finds the power belt of Sgt. Strike, a hero that fought for the US in WWII and Korea, and disappeared during the McCarthy years.

Reception
Martin A. Stever reviewed Strike! in Space Gamer/Fantasy Gamer No. 83. Stever commented that "The strength of this comic is solid art and Dixon's stories. The reader has absolutely no idea as to what is going to happen next; so each story is a real adventure. The hero, the archetypical poor but bright high school student, is written with realistic human motivations, making us very sympathetic to his cause, beating the tar out of bad guys."

References

Eclipse Comics titles